Pavo Crnac (born 10 March 1971) is a retired Croatian football defender.

References

1971 births
Living people
Sportspeople from Slavonski Brod
Association football defenders
Croatian footballers
NK Marsonia players
NK Slaven Belupo players
NK Koprivnica players
Croatian Football League players
First Football League (Croatia) players